Gunhild (stylized gunhild), is a French clothing company, known for its fashion clothing offerings for women. Gunhild is based in Paris, France, and was established in Paris in 2007 by the Norwegian designer Gunhild Nygaard. The collection of 2009 was awarded with the Créateur de l'Année from the Mayor of Paris, France.

The Gunhild collections are both designed and produced in France. The collections are primarily sold in France but are also exported to other countries, such as Canada, Japan, Italy, China, Turkey, and Norway.

References

External links 
The official site

Clothing brands
Clothing companies of France
French companies established in 2007
French brands
French fashion